Mandy Marchak (born November 24, 1984) is a Canadian rugby footballer. She represented  at three rugby union World Cups in 2006, 2010 and 2014 and at rugby league in 2017 World Cup. She also played in two Sevens World Cups in 2009 and 2013.

She also spent two years in the United Kingdom with the Saracens side.

Marchak retired from rugby union in 2016 due to injury. She then took up rugby league and was selected to represent the Canada Ravens at the 2017 Women's Rugby League World Cup.

References

External links
 Rugby Canada Player Profile 

1984 births
Living people
Canadian female rugby union players
Canada women's international rugby union players
Canadian female rugby league players
Canada women's national rugby league team players
Female rugby sevens players
Sportspeople from Winnipeg
Canada international women's rugby sevens players